Borkhar may refer to:
Borkhar County
Borkhar-e Gharbi Rural District
Borkhar-e Markazi Rural District
Borkhar-e Sharqi Rural District